Casualty is a British medical drama television series that has been broadcast on BBC One in the United Kingdom since 6 September 1986. The series was created by Jeremy Brock and Paul Unwin and focuses on the fictional lives, both professional and personal, of the medical and ancillary staff at the Accident and Emergency Department of the fictional Holby City Hospital, based in the equally fictitious town of Holby. It is the longest-running primetime and emergency medical drama television series in the world. It was primarily filmed in the city of Bristol until 2011 when it began filming at Roath Lock Studios in Cardiff, where it has remained since. The show has aired thirty-six full series with over 1000 episodes and is currently airing the thirty-seventh series. Brock and Unwin devised the serial after being inspired by the "comedy and heroics" of life in the National Health Service (NHS) and tackled a string of controversial topics through the show. A spin-off series, Holby City, began airing from 1999 and follows patients' stories after they are transferred to the hospital's surgical wards. A police procedural spin-off, HolbyBlue, began airing from 8 May 2007, running for two series before being cancelled due to poor viewing figures.

The serial features an ensemble cast of regular and recurring characters. It began with ten main characters in its first series, with nurse Charlie Fairhead, portrayed by Derek Thompson, the only character to have remained on the show from its creation. Since the show's inception, characters have been written in and out of the series. Additionally, Casualty features a number of guest artists in each episode as well as recurring characters who appear in story arcs. Many regular cast members in the show have made prior, minor appearances as both patients and staff members in both Casualty and Holby City. In 2004, casting directors hired Susan Cookson for the regular role of Maggie Coldwell after a recurring part as anaesthetist Julie Day between 1998 and 2000. Characters from Casualty have appeared in spin-off series Holby City  and HolbyBlue and vice versa. Although most characters only guest star, some have become regular cast members. Amanda Mealing joined Casualty as Connie Beauchamp in 2014, following a six-year stint in Holby City. Nick Jordan actor Michael French has had stints in the main cast of both Holby City and Casualty, and Clive Mantle reprised his role as Mike Barratt in Holby City in 1999, two years after leaving Casualty.

Present characters

Regular characters

Recurring characters

Former characters

Regular characters

Recurring characters

Footnotes

References

Bibliography

External links 
 
 Casualty characters and cast at the Internet Movie Database

Casualty (TV series) characters
^
Characters